Vice Admiral (ret.) Arthur Karl Cebrowski (August 13, 1942 – November 12, 2005) was a United States Navy admiral. He also who served from October 2001 to January 2005 as Director of the Office of Force Transformation in the U.S. Department of Defense. In this position, he was responsible for serving as an advocate, focal point, and catalyst for the transformation of the United States military.

Early life and naval career
Cebrowski was born in Passaic, New Jersey to a Polish American family. He was a 1964 graduate of Villanova University, held a master's degree in computer systems management from the Naval Postgraduate School and attended the Naval War College.

He entered the navy through the Reserve Officers Training Corps in 1964.

Cebrowski was a naval aviator and commanded Fighter Squadron 41 (VF-41) and Carrier Air Wing 8.  He commanded the assault ship USS Guam, the aircraft carrier USS Midway, and the USS America Battle Group. In December 1993, as a RADM(L), he was commanding Carrier Group 6.

He had combat experience in Vietnam and Desert Storm. His joint assignments included service as the Director, Command, Control, Communications and Computers (J-6), Joint Staff.

Admiral Cebrowski retired from the Navy on October 1, 2001, with over 37 years of service, after serving as the President of the Naval War College in Newport, Rhode Island.

Office of Force Transformation
The Secretary of Defense called for the creation of the Office of Force Transformation in support of President George W. Bush's broad mandate to transform the nation's military capabilities. The transformation was intended to challenge the status quo with new concepts for American defense to ensure an overwhelming and continuing competitive advantage for America's military for decades to come. Cebrowski was appointed by Secretary of Defense Donald Rumsfeld, effective October 29, 2001, reporting directly to the Secretary and Deputy Secretary of Defense.

As Director of Force Transformation, Admiral Cebrowski worked to link transformation to strategic functions, evaluated the transformation efforts of the military departments, and promoted synergy by recommending steps to integrate ongoing transformation activities. Among his primary responsibilities, Admiral Cebrowski monitored service and joint experimentation programs and made policy recommendations to the Secretary and Deputy Secretary of Defense.

Vice Admiral Cebrowski died on November 12, 2005, aged 63. He was buried in Arlington National Cemetery on January 9, 2006.

See also

Network-centric warfare
Gray Eagle Award

References

External links
Biography from the Office of Force Transformation
Portrait of Admiral Cebrowski by Margaret Holland Sargent

1942 births
2005 deaths
American people of Polish descent
People from Passaic, New Jersey
Villanova University alumni
United States Naval Aviators
United States Navy personnel of the Vietnam War
Naval Postgraduate School alumni
United States Navy personnel of the Gulf War
United States Navy vice admirals
Presidents of the Naval War College
United States Department of Defense officials
Burials at Arlington National Cemetery
Military personnel from New Jersey
20th-century American academics